Andrés Palop Cervera (born 22 October 1973) is a Spanish former professional footballer who played as a goalkeeper, currently a manager.

After having languished on the bench of hometown club Valencia for most of his stay, he became a premiere player with Sevilla well into his 30s, helping it consolidate in both the domestic and European fronts. Over 15 seasons, he appeared in 295 matches in La Liga, where he also represented Villarreal in 1998–99.

Palop was selected by Spain for Euro 2008, but never earned an international cap.

Playing career

Club

Valencia
Born in L'Alcúdia, Valencian Community, Palop was a youth product of local giants Valencia CF, and his first professional seasons were spent at neighbours Villarreal CF, in a two-year loan spell. He was the undisputed starter in both the side's La Liga promotion in 1998 – a first ever– and relegation the following season, being subsequently recalled by the Che.

In his six-year stint with the main squad, however, Palop was mostly backup to veteran Santiago Cañizares, his most games consisting of 15 in his first year. As the club was crowned league champions in 2002 and 2004, he could only appear a total of seven times (all in the former campaign), and eventually grew unsettled; he was also part of the squad that won the 2003–04 UEFA Cup in Gothenburg.

Sevilla
Palop joined Sevilla FC in summer 2005, quickly becoming one of the Andalusians' cornerstones as they added five titles in only one year. On 15 March 2007, he made headlines when he scored an injury time-equalising goal in the UEFA Cup round-of-16 tie against FC Shakhtar Donetsk, forcing extra time as a result – his team, which had drawn 2–2 at home in the first leg, went on to win 3–2, and eventually the competition for the second consecutive time; in the final against fellow Spaniards RCD Espanyol he stopped three of four penalty kicks in the shootout, being named Player of the match.

In the following campaigns, veteran Palop continued to be first choice, never appearing in fewer than 31 league matches. In 2009–10 he helped to a fourth place in the league, with the subsequent qualification for the UEFA Champions League, and victory in the Copa del Rey.

Bayer Leverkusen
In early June 2013, Palop signed a one-year contract with Bayer 04 Leverkusen, moving abroad for the first time at the age of nearly 40. He was used exclusively as back-up by the German Bundesliga club, and in April 2014 announced his retirement.

International
Palop was first called up for Spain in August 2007, for a friendly with Greece, after a last-minute injury to Iker Casillas. However, he did not leave the bench.

Uncapped, Palop lost a narrow competition with Pepe Reina of Liverpool for second choice at UEFA Euro 2008, but beat FC Barcelona's Víctor Valdés for the third spot on the squad. During the ceremony following Spain's victory in the tournament, he wore Luis Arconada's original Euro 1984 final shirt; he received the gold medal from Michel Platini (who had won the 1984 continental competition, scoring the final opener from an Arconada blunder), later president of UEFA.

Coaching career
On 18 February 2015, Palop was named manager at CD Alcoyano for the remainder of the season in Segunda División B. In June, after achieving the sufficient qualifications, he took the post on a permanent basis, announcing his exit in May 2016.

Palop was appointed as the new head coach of UD Ibiza on 27 September 2018, with that club also competing in the third level. He was dismissed the following 25 February after winning ten of his 21 games, leaving the team eight points from a playoff place.

In April 2020, Palop was hospitalised for 12 days during the coronavirus pandemic. Two years later, he was UEFA's ambassador for the Europa League Final at the Ramón Sánchez Pizjuán Stadium in Seville.

Style of play
Palop was mainly known for his shot-stopping abilities, and also earned a reputation as a penalty-saving specialist throughout his career.

Club statistics
Sources:

Managerial statistics

Honours
Valencia
La Liga: 2001–02
UEFA Cup: 2003–04
UEFA Super Cup: 2004

Sevilla
Copa del Rey: 2006–07, 2009–10
Supercopa de España: 2007; Runner-up 2010
UEFA Cup: 2005–06, 2006–07
UEFA Super Cup: 2006; Runner-up 2007

Spain
UEFA European Championship: 2008

References

External links

1973 births
Living people
People from Ribera Alta (comarca)
Sportspeople from the Province of Valencia
Spanish footballers
Footballers from the Valencian Community
Association football goalkeepers
La Liga players
Segunda División players
Segunda División B players
Valencia CF Mestalla footballers
Valencia CF players
Villarreal CF players
Sevilla FC players
Bayer 04 Leverkusen players
UEFA Cup winning players
UEFA Euro 2008 players
UEFA European Championship-winning players
Spanish expatriate footballers
Expatriate footballers in Germany
Spanish expatriate sportspeople in Germany
Spanish football managers
Segunda División B managers
CD Alcoyano managers
UD Ibiza managers